The 1922 Ohio gubernatorial election was held on November 7, 1922. Democratic nominee A. Victor Donahey narrowly defeated Republican nominee Carmi Thompson with 50.56% of the vote.

Primary elections
Primary elections were held on August 8, 1922.

Republican primary

Candidates
Carmi Thompson, former Treasurer of the United States
Charles Landon Knight, U.S. Representative
Homer Durand
Harvey C. Smith, Ohio Secretary of State
Arthur H. Day, State Senator
Rupert R. Beetham, Speaker of the Ohio House of Representatives
Henry Clay Smith, former State Representative
Daniel W. Williams 
J. W. Durnell

Results

General election

Candidates
A. Victor Donahey, Democratic
Carmi Thompson, Republican

Results

References

1922
Ohio
Gubernatorial